The Payne–Aldrich Tariff Act of 1909 (ch. 6, 36 Stat. 11), named for Representative Sereno E. Payne (R–NY) and Senator Nelson W. Aldrich (R–RI), began in the United States House of Representatives as a bill raising certain tariffs on goods entering the United States.  The high rates angered Republican reformers, and led to a deep split in the Republican Party.

History

Protectionism was the ideological cement holding the Republican coalition together. High tariffs were used by Republicans to promise higher sales to business, higher wages to industrial workers, and higher demand for farm products.  Progressive insurgents said it promoted monopoly. Democrats said it was a tax on the little man. It had greatest support in the Northeast, and greatest opposition in the South and West. The Midwest was the battle ground.

President William Howard Taft called Congress into a special session in 1909 shortly after his inauguration to discuss the issue. Thus, the House of Representatives immediately passed a tariff bill sponsored by Payne, calling for reduced tariffs. However, the United States Senate speedily substituted a bill written by Aldrich, calling for fewer reductions and more increases in tariffs. It was the first change in tariff laws since the Dingley Act of 1897.  Progressive Republicans wanted to lower tariffs but Conservative leader Senator Aldrich prevailed by winning over some Democrats (despite the Democratic national platform calling for lower tariffs). These Democrats represented states with industry facing imports of iron ore, lumber, hides, coal, and other items. Senator Joseph Bailey of Texas defended the votes but Democrats William Jennings Bryan, Henry Watterson, and Josephus Daniels denounced them. In response the Democratic caucus imposed more discipline before the Democrats took control of the House in 1911.

An additional provision of the bill provided for the creation of a tariff board to study the problem of tariff modification in full and to collect information on the subject for the use of Congress and the President in future tariff considerations. Another provision allowed for free trade with the Philippines, then under American control. Congress passed the bill officially on April 9, 1909. The bill states it would "take effect the day following its passage." President Taft officially signed the bill at 5:05 PM on August 5, 1909.

Impact
The Payne Act had the immediate effect of frustrating proponents of reducing tariffs. In particular, the bill greatly angered Progressives, who began to withdraw support from President Taft. Because it increased the duty on print paper used by publishers, the publishing industry viciously criticized the President, further tarnishing his image. Although Taft met and consulted with Congress during its deliberations on the bill, critics charged that he ought to have imposed more of his own recommendations on the bill such as that of a slower schedule. However, unlike his predecessor (Theodore Roosevelt), Taft felt that the president should not dictate lawmaking and should leave Congress free to act as it saw fit. Taft signed the bill with enthusiasm on 5 August 1909, expecting it would stimulate the economy and enhance his political standing. He especially praised the provision empowering the president to raise rates on countries which discriminated against American products, and the provision for free trade with the Philippines.

The defection of insurgent Republicans from the Midwest began Taft's slippage of support. It heralded conflicts over conservation, patronage, and progressive legislation. The debate over the tariff thus split the Republican Party into Progressives and Old Guards and led the split party to lose the 1910 congressional election.

Corporate Income Tax
The bill also enacted a small income tax on the privilege of conducting business as a corporation, which was affirmed in the Supreme Court decision Flint v. Stone Tracy Co. (also known as the Corporation Tax case).

References

Further reading
 Aldrich, Mark. "Tariffs and Trusts, Profiteers and Middlemen: Popular Explanations for the High Cost of Living, 1897–1920." History of Political Economy 45.4 (2013): 693–746.
 Barfield, Claude E. "'Our Share of the Booty': The Democratic Party Cannonism, and the Payne–Aldrich Tariff."  Journal of American History  (1970) 57#2 pp. 308–23.  in JSTOR
 Brawley, Mark R. " 'And we would have the field': US Steel and American trade policy, 1908–1912." Business and Politics 19.3 (2017): 424-453.

 Coletta, Paolo Enrico. The Presidency of William Howard Taft (University Press of Kansas, 1973) pp 61–71.
 Detzer, David W. "Businessmen, Reformers and Tariff Revision: The Payne–Aldrich Tariff of 1909." Historian  (1973) 35#2 pp. 196–204.
 Fisk, George.  "The Payne-Aldrich Tariff," Political Science Quarterly (1910) 25#1 pp. 35–68; in JSTOR
 Gould, Lewis L. "Western Range Senators and the Payne–Aldrich Tariff." Pacific Northwest Quarterly (1973): 49–56.  in JSTOR
 Gould, Lewis L.  "New Perspectives on the Republican Party, 1877–1913," American Historical Review (1972) 77#4 pp. 1074–82 in JSTOR
 Gould, Lewis L. The William Howard Taft Presidency (University Press of Kansas, 2009) 51–64.
 Mowry, George E. Theodore Roosevelt and the Progressive Movement (1946) pp. 36–65 online.
 Mowry, George E. The Era of Theodore Roosevelt, 1900-1912 (1958) pp. 242–247 read online
 Solvick, Stanley D.  "William Howard Taft and the Payne-Aldrich Tariff." Mississippi Valley Historical Review (1963) pp. 424–42 in JSTOR.
 Taussig, Frank W. The Tariff History of the United States (8th ed. 1931), pp. 361–408 online
 Wolman, Paul. Most Favored Nation: The Republican Revisionists and US Tariff Policy, 1897-1912 (U of North Carolina Press, 2000).

1909 in law
1909 in the United States
United States federal taxation legislation
Economic history of the United States
History of international trade
1909 in international relations
United States federal trade legislation